The Fulbright Program, including the Fulbright–Hays Program, is one of several United States Cultural Exchange Programs with the goal of improving intercultural relations, cultural diplomacy, and intercultural competence between the people of the United States and other countries, through the exchange of persons, knowledge, and skills. Via the program, competitively-selected American citizens including students, scholars, teachers, professionals, scientists, and artists may receive scholarships or grants to study, conduct research, teach, or exercise their talents abroad; and citizens of other countries may qualify to do the same in the United States. The program was founded by United States Senator J. William Fulbright in 1946 and is considered to be one of the most widely recognized and prestigious scholarships in the world. The program provides approximately 8,000 grants annually—roughly 1,600 to U.S. students, 1,200 to U.S. scholars, 4,000 to foreign students, 900 to foreign visiting scholars, and several hundred to teachers and professionals.

The Fulbright Program is administered by cooperating organizations such as the Institute of International Education and operates in over 160 countries around the world. The Bureau of Educational and Cultural Affairs of the U.S. Department of State sponsors the Fulbright Program and receives funding from the United States Congress via annual appropriation bills. Additional direct and in-kind support comes from partner governments, foundations, corporations, and host institutions both in and outside the U.S. In 49 countries, a bi-national Fulbright Commission administers and oversees the Fulbright Program. In countries that have an active program but no Fulbright Commission, the Public Affairs Section of the U.S. Embassy oversees the Fulbright Program. More than 370,000 people have participated in the program since it began; 62 Fulbright alumni have won Nobel Prizes; 88 have won Pulitzer Prizes.

History 

In 1945, Senator J. William Fulbright proposed a bill to use the proceeds from selling surplus U.S. government war property to fund international exchange between the U.S. and other countries. With the crucial timing of the aftermath of the Second World War and with the pressing establishment of the United Nations, the Fulbright Program was an attempt to promote peace and understanding through educational exchange. The bill devised a plan to forgo the debts foreign countries amassed during the war in return for funding an international educational program. It was through the belief that this program would be an essential vehicle to promote peace and mutual understanding between individuals, institutions and future leaders wherever they may be.

In August 1946, Congress created the Fulbright Program in what became the largest education exchange program in history. The program was expanded by the Mutual Educational And Cultural Exchange Act of 1961, known as Fulbright-Hays Act. It made possible participation in international fairs and expositions, including trade and industrial fairs; translations; funding for American studies programs; funds to promote medical, scientific, cultural, and educational research and development; and modern foreign language training.

The program operates on a bi-national basis; each country has entered into an agreement with the U.S. government. The first countries to sign agreements were China in 1947 and Burma, the Philippines, and Greece in 1948.

Program 

The Fulbright Program exchanges scholars and students with numerous countries in bilateral partnerships managed by commissions for each country. It provides funding for U.S. persons to visit other countries in the U.S. Student Program, U.S. Scholar Program, Teacher Exchange Program, and others, and enables foreign nationals to visit the United States in programs such as the Foreign Student Program, Visiting Scholar Program, Teacher Exchange Program.

Candidates recommended for Fulbright grants have high academic achievement, a compelling project proposal or statement of purpose, demonstrated leadership potential, and flexibility and adaptability to interact successfully with the host community.

Fulbright grants are awarded in almost all academic disciplines, except clinical medical research involving patient contact. Fulbright grantees' fields of study span the fine arts, humanities, social sciences, mathematics, natural and physical sciences, and professional and applied sciences.
You can check the list of Fulbright Scholarships that is recommended for the undergraduate and graduate students who want to continue their studies in USA.

Student grants 
 The Fulbright Degree Program funds graduate education for international students wanting to study in the United States. Students apply for the scholarship in their home country and after a long process, they can pursue a Masters or Ph.D. program in the United States.
 The Fulbright U.S. Student Program offers fellowships for U.S. graduating college seniors, graduate students, young professionals, and artists to research, study, or teach English abroad for one academic year. The program facilitates cultural exchange through direct interaction on an individual basis in the classroom, field, home, and in routine tasks, allowing the grantee to gain an appreciation of others' viewpoints and beliefs, the way they do things, and the way they think. The application period opens in the spring of each year. Since the inaugural class in 1949, Harvard, Yale, Berkeley, Columbia, and Michigan have been the top producers of U.S. Student Program scholars. Michigan has been the leading producer since 2005.

 The Fulbright Foreign Student Program enables graduate students, young professionals, and artists from abroad to conduct research and study in the United States. Some scholarships are renewed after the initial year of study. 
 The Fulbright Foreign Language Teaching Assistant Program provides opportunities for young English teachers from overseas to refine their teaching skills and broaden their knowledge of U.S. culture and society while strengthening the instruction of foreign languages at colleges and universities in the United States.
 The International Fulbright Science and Technology Award, a component of the Fulbright Foreign Student Program, supports doctoral study at leading U.S. institutions in science, technology, engineering or related fields for outstanding foreign students. This program is currently on hiatus.
 The Fulbright-mtvU Fellowships award up to four U.S. students the opportunity to study the power of music as a cultural force abroad. Fellows conduct research for one academic year on projects of their own design about a chosen musical aspect. They share their experiences during their Fulbright year via video reports, blogs, and podcasts.
 The Fulbright-Clinton Fellowship provides the opportunity for U.S. students to serve in professional placements in foreign government ministries or institutions to gain hands-on public sector experience in participating foreign countries.
 The Fulbright Schuman Program awards scholarships to American citizens for research in the European Union with a focus on EU affairs/policy, or the US-EU transatlantic agenda.

Scholar grants 
 The Fulbright Distinguished Chair Awards comprise approximately forty distinguished lecturing, distinguished research and distinguished lecturing/research awards ranging from three to 12 months. Fulbright Distinguished Chair Awards are viewed as among the most prestigious appointments in the U.S. Fulbright Scholar Program. Candidates should be eminent scholars and have a significant publication and teaching record.
The Fulbright Bicentennial Chair in American Studies at the University of Helsinki brings scholars of various disciplines to Finland. The Bicentennial Chair is open to senior faculty with outstanding publication and teaching credentials and is also considered to be among the most prestigious Fulbright appointments.
 The Fulbright U.S. Scholar Program sends U.S. faculty members, scholars, and professionals abroad to lecture or conduct research for up to a year.
 The Fulbright Specialist Program sends U.S. academics and professionals to serve as expert consultants on curriculum, faculty development, institutional planning, and related subjects at overseas institutions for a period of two to six weeks.
 The Fulbright Visiting Scholar Program and Fulbright Scholar-in-Residence Program bring foreign scholars to lecture or conduct post-doctoral research for up to a year at U.S. colleges and universities.
 The Fulbright Regional Network for Applied Research (NEXUS) Program is a network of junior scholars, professionals, and mid-career applied researchers from the United States, Brazil, Canada, and other Western Hemisphere nations in a year-long program that includes multi-disciplinary, team-based research, a series of three seminar meetings, and a Fulbright exchange experience.

Teacher grants 
The Fulbright Teacher Exchange Program supports one-to-one exchanges of teachers from K–12 schools and a small number of post-secondary institutions.

The Distinguished Fulbright Awards in Teaching Program sends teachers abroad for a semester to pursue individual projects, conduct research, and lead master classes or seminars.

Grants for professionals 
The Hubert H. Humphrey Program brings outstanding mid-career professionals from the developing world and societies in transition to the United States for one year. Fellows participate in a non-degree program of academic study and gain professional experience.

The Fulbright U.S. Scholar Program sends American scholars and professionals abroad to lecture or conduct research for up to a year.

The Fulbright Specialist Program sends U.S. faculty and professionals to serve as expert consultants on curriculum, faculty development, institutional planning, and related subjects at overseas academic institutions for a period of two to six weeks.

The Fulbright U.S. Student Program offers fellowships for U.S. graduating seniors, graduate students, young professionals and artists to study abroad for one academic year. The Program also includes an English Teaching Assistant component.

The Fulbright Foreign Student Program enables graduate students, young professionals and artists from abroad to conduct research and study in the United States. Some scholarships are renewed after the initial year of study.

Fulbright–Hays Program 
The Fulbright–Hays Program is a component of the Fulbright Program funded by a congressional appropriation to the United States Department of Education. It awards grants to individual U.S. K through 14 pre-teachers, teachers and administrators, pre-doctoral students, and post-doctoral faculty, as well as to U.S. institutions and organizations. Funding supports research and training efforts overseas, which focus on non-western foreign languages and area studies.

Administration 
The program is coordinated by the Bureau of Educational and Cultural Affairs (ECA) of the U.S. Department of State under policy guidelines established by the Fulbright Foreign Scholarship Board (FSB), with the help of 50 bi-national Fulbright commissions, U.S. embassies, and cooperating organizations in the U.S.

The United States Department of State is responsible for managing, coordinating and overseeing the Fulbright program. Bureau of Educational and Cultural Affairs is the bureau in the Department of State that has primary responsibility for the administration of the program.

The Fulbright Foreign Scholarship Board is a twelve-member board of educational and public leaders appointed by the President of the United States that determines general policy and direction for the Fulbright Program and approves all candidates nominated for Fulbright Scholarships.

Bi-national Fulbright commissions and foundations, most of which are funded jointly by the U.S. and partner governments, develop priorities for the program, including the numbers and categories of grants. More specifically, they plan and implement educational exchanges, recruit and nominate candidates for fellowships; designate qualified local educational institutions to host Fulbrighters; fundraise; engage alumni; support incoming U.S. Fulbrighters; and, in many countries, operate an information service for the public on educational opportunities in the United States.

In a country active in the program without a Fulbright commission, the Public Affairs Section of the U.S. Embassy administers the Fulbright Program, including recruiting and nominating candidates for grants to the U.S., overseeing U.S. Fulbrighters on their grant in the country, and engaging alumni.

Established in 1919 in the aftermath of World War I, the Institute of International Education was created to catalyze educational exchange. In 1946, the U.S. Department of State invited IIE to administer the graduate student component and CIES to administer the faculty component of the Fulbright Program—IIE's largest program to date.

The Council for International Exchange of Scholars is a division of IIE that administers the Fulbright Scholar Program.

AMIDEAST administers Fulbright Foreign Student grants for grantees from the Middle East and North Africa, excluding Israel.

LASPAU: Affiliated with Harvard University LASPAU brings together a valuable network of individuals, institutions, leaders and organizations devoted to building knowledge-based societies across the Americas. Among other functions, LASPAU administers the Junior Faculty Development Program, a part of the Fulbright Foreign Student Program, for grantees from Central and South America and the Caribbean.

World Learning administers the Fulbright Specialist Program.

American Councils for International Education (ACTR/ACCELS) administers the Junior Faculty Development Program (JFDP), a special academic exchange for grantees from the Caucasus, Central Asia, and Southeast Europe.

The Academy for Educational Development administers the Fulbright Classroom Teacher Exchange Program and the Distinguished Fulbright Awards in Teaching Program.

Related organizations 
The Fulbright Association is an organization independent of the Fulbright Program and not associated with the U.S. Department of State. The Fulbright Association was established on February 27, 1977, as a private nonprofit, membership organization with over 9,000 members. The late Arthur Power Dudden was its founding president. He wanted alumni to educate members of the U.S. Congress and the public about the benefits of advancing increased mutual understanding between the people of the United States and those of other countries. In addition to the Fulbright Association in the U.S., independent Fulbright Alumni associations exist in over 75 countries around the world.

The Fulbright Academy is an organization independent of the Fulbright Program and not associated with the U.S. Department of State. A non-partisan, non-profit organization with members worldwide, the Fulbright Academy focuses on the professional advancement and collaboration needs among the 100,000+ Fulbright alumni in science, technology, and related fields. The Fulbright Academy works with individual and institutional members, Fulbright alumni associations and other organizations interested in leveraging the unique knowledge and skills of Fulbright alumni.

Bilateral commissions 
The Fulbright Program has commissions in 49 of the over 160 countries with which it has bilateral partnerships. These foundations are funded jointly by the U.S. and partner governments. The role of the Fulbright Commissions is to plan and implement educational exchanges; recruit and nominate candidates, both domestic and foreign, for fellowships; designate qualified local educational institutions to host Fulbrighters; and support incoming U.S. Fulbrighters while engaging with alumni. Below is a list of current commissions.

J. William Fulbright Prize for International Understanding  
The J. William Fulbright Prize for International Understanding is awarded by the Fulbright Association to recognize individuals or organisations which have made extraordinary contributions toward bringing peoples, cultures, or nations to greater understanding of others. Established in 1993, the prize was first awarded to Nelson Mandela.

Notable alumni 

Fulbright alumni have occupied key roles in government, academia, and industry. Of the more than 325,000 alumni:
 89 have received the Pulitzer Prize
 78 have been MacArthur Fellows
 62 have received a Nobel Prize
 40 have served as head of state or government
 10 have been elected to the U.S. Congress
 1 has served as secretary general of the United Nations

The following list is a selected group of notable Fulbright grant recipients:

 William D. "Bro" Adams, university administrator and NEH Chair (2014–2017)
 Edward Albee, recipient (three times) of the Pulitzer Prize for Drama
 Karim Alrawi, recipient of the Samuel Beckett Award for the Performing Arts, President of Egyptian Pen (1992–1994)
 Francis Andersen, Australian Hebrew and biblical studies scholar
 John Ashbery, American poet
 Gustavo V. Barbosa-Cánovas, Uruguayan American Professor of Food Engineering and Director of the Center for Nonthermal Processing of Food at Washington State University
 George Benneh, Ghanaian academic, university administrator and public servant
 Victor Bianchini, U.S. federal judge, California State superior court judge, retired  Colonel of U.S. Marine Corps; former law school dean
 Harold Bloom, literary theorist and critic
 Boutros Boutros-Ghali, Egyptian politician and Secretary-General of the United Nations, 1992–1996
 Michael Broyde (born 1964), American law professor
 Kofi Abrefa Busia, Ghanaian academic and Prime Minister of Ghana (1969–1972)
 Fernando Henrique Cardoso, President of Brazil from 1995 to 2002
 Kyle Carey, Celtic American musician
 Bob Carr, Australian politician
 Ron Castan, Australian Constitutional law barrister
 Lenora Champagne, playwright, performance artist and director
 Ibrahim M. El-Sherbiny, Egyptian materials scientist
 Dante R. Chialvo, scientist
 Dale Chihuly, glass sculptor and entrepreneur
Eugenie Clark, American ichthyologist and founder of Mote Marine Laboratory
George C. Clerk, Ghanaian botanist and plant pathologist pioneer
 Aliye Pekin Çelik, United Nations Official
 J. M. Coetzee, South-African author, recipient of the Nobel Prize in Literature in 2003
 Nathan Collett, filmmaker
 Aaron Copland, recipient of the Pulitzer Prize for Music
 Leah Curtis, Australian composer 
 Myanna Dellinger, Danish-American law professor
 Vicente Blanco Gaspar, ambassador of Spain
 Arthur Deshaies, artist, printmaker, professor and head of the graphic workshop, Florida State University
 Rita Dove, U.S. Poet Laureate and recipient of the Pulitzer Prize for Poetry
 Eugenia Del Pino, developmental biologist, Ecuadorian
 Eric Foner, recipient of the Pulitzer Prize for History
 John Hope Franklin, historian and Presidential Medal of Freedom recipient
 Maryellen Fullerton, lawyer and law professor and interim dean at Brooklyn Law School
 Radhika Gajjala,  a communications and a cultural studies professor,
 Philip A. Gale, British chemist and university administrator,
 Ashraf Ghani, the President of Afghanistan 
 Gabby Giffords, United States Representative for Arizona's 8th congressional district 
 Robert A. Gorman (born 1937), law professor at the University of Pennsylvania Law School
 Wendy Greengross (1925–2012), general practitioner and broadcaster
 Nigel Healey, Vice Chancellor, Fiji National University 
Robert Hess (1938–1994), President of Brooklyn College
John Honnold (1915–2011), American law professor at the University of Pennsylvania Law School
 Ross Horning, American historian
Julia Ioffe (born 1982), Russian-born American journalist
 Michael Janis, glass sculptor and educator 
 Rahul M. Jindal, Indian-American transplant surgeon at Uniformed Services University.
Roberta Karmel (born 1937), Centennial Professor of Law at Brooklyn Law School, and first female Commissioner of the U.S. Securities and Exchange Commission.
Charles Kennedy, British politician.
 Suzanne Klotz, painter and sculptor
 Carrie Lam, the Chief Executive of Hong Kong from 2017 to 2022
 Karen LaMonte, sculptor
 Ben Lerner, writer
 John Lithgow, actor
 Dolph Lundgren, actor
 Jamil Mahuad, President of Ecuador from 1998 to 2000
 John Atta Mills, legal scholar and President of Ghana (2009–2012)
 Baidyanath Misra, former Vice-Chancellor of the Odisha University of Agriculture and Technology
 Daniel Patrick Moynihan, United States Senator and diplomat
 Koh Tsu Koon, Malaysian politician
 Robert Nozick, American political philosopher
 Joan Oates, archaeologist
 Mikael Owunna, photographer
 Linus Pauling, awarded the Nobel Prize in Chemistry and the Nobel Peace Prize
 Sylvia Plath, poet, recipient of the Pulitzer Prize for Poetry in 1982
 Niharica Raizada, actress
 Ian Rankin, author 2023
 Maria Ressa, awarded the Nobel Peace Prize
 Theodore Roethke, poet, recipient of the Pulitzer Prize for Poetry in 1954 and the National Book Award for Poetry in 1959 and 1965  
 Juan Manuel Santos, the former President of Colombia from 2010 and 2018. Recipient of the Nobel Peace Prize in 2016
 Philip Schultz poet
 E. Anne Schwerdtfeger, composer and choral conductor
 Heather J. Sharkey, historian of the Middle East and Africa at the University of Pennsylvania
 Wallace Shawn, actor and playwright
 Jane Smiley, recipient of the Pulitzer Prize for Fiction
 Williametta Spencer, composer
 Joseph Stiglitz, recipient of the Nobel Prize in Economics
 Herbert Storing, Robert Kent Gooch Professor of Government and Foreign Affairs at the University of Virginia
 Robert S. Summers, law professor at Cornell Law School
 Rishi Sunak, Prime Minister of the United Kingdom
 Sergio Troncoso, author of From This Wicked Patch of Dust, Crossing Borders: Personal Essays, and The Nature of Truth
 Sasha Velour, queen, artist, and winner of season nine of RuPaul's Drag Race
 Eudora Welty, recipient of the Pulitzer Prize for Fiction
 C. Vann Woodward, recipient of the Pulitzer Prize for History
 Charles Wright, American poet 
 James Wright, American poet
 Muhammad Yunus, awarded the Nobel Peace Prize

See also 

 Academic mobility
 Belgian American Educational Foundation (BAEF)
 Chevening Scholarship
 Chiang Ching-kuo Foundation
 Cultural diplomacy
 EducationUSA
 Erasmus Programme
 German Academic Exchange Service (Deutscher Akademischer Austauschdienst)
 Harkness Fellowship
 ITT International Fellowship Program
 Jürgen Mulert
 Marshall Scholarship
 Gates Cambridge Scholarship
 Monbukagakusho Scholarship
 Rhodes Scholarship
 Yenching Scholarship 
 Jardine Scholarship

References

External links 
 U.S. Department of State Fulbright Website, the program's sponsor
 Fulbright–Hays information, U.S. Department of Education
 Fulbright Scholar Program, grants for university and college faculty, administrators and professionals
 Fulbright Teacher Exchange Programs, K–12 Teacher Exchange

Directories of past grantees
 US Bureau of Educational & Cultural Affairs: International Exchange Alumni
 Fulbright Scholar Directory
 US Student Program

Academic transfer
Student exchange
Scholarships in the United States
1946 establishments in the United States
American education awards
Bureau of Educational and Cultural Affairs
United States Department of State
Government scholarships
Fulbright alumni